Italian(s) may refer to:
 Anything of, from, or related to the people of Italy over the centuries
 Italians, an ethnic group or simply a citizen of the Italian Republic or Italian Kingdom
 Italian language, a Romance language
 Regional Italian, regional variants of the Italian language
 Languages of Italy, languages and dialects spoken in Italy
 Italian culture, cultural features of Italy
 Italian cuisine, traditional foods
 Folklore of Italy, the folklore and urban legends of Italy
 Mythology of Italy, traditional religion and beliefs

Other uses
 Italian dressing, a vinaigrette-type salad dressing or marinade
 Italian or Italian-A, alternative names for the Ping-Pong virus, an extinct computer virus

See also
 
 
 Italia (disambiguation)
 Italic (disambiguation)
 Italo (disambiguation)
 The Italian (disambiguation)
 Italian people (disambiguation)

Language and nationality disambiguation pages